is the former Chief Medical Examiner-Coroner for the County of Los Angeles. Popularly known as the "coroner to the stars", Noguchi determined the cause of death in many high-profile cases in Hollywood during the 1960s and 1970s. He performed autopsies on Marilyn Monroe, Albert Dekker, Robert F. Kennedy, Sharon Tate, Inger Stevens, Janis Joplin, Gia Scala, David Janssen, Divine, William Holden, and John Belushi.

Early life and education 
Noguchi was born in Fukuoka Prefecture, raised in Yokosuka and graduated from Tokyo's Nippon Medical School in 1951 before interning at The University of Tokyo School of Medicine Hospital. Shortly thereafter he emigrated to the United States. He then served a second internship at Orange County General Hospital and a series of residencies at Loma Linda University School of Medicine, and Barlow Sanatorium in Los Angeles.

Career

Early career 
Noguchi began working in the office of the Chief Medical Examiner-Coroner for the County of Los Angeles (CME) in 1961, and came to public attention after performing the autopsy of Marilyn Monroe.

In 1967, he was appointed Chief Medical Examiner-Coroner for the County of Los Angeles (CME) in a 3–2 vote of the Los Angeles County Board of Supervisors, over the opposition of the Los Angeles County Medical Association and leadership of the UCLA and USC schools of medicine. As new CME, he succeeded his mentor Theodore Curphey and supervised autopsies on a range of celebrities and public figures that included Albert Dekker, Sharon Tate, Janis Joplin, Inger Stevens, Gia Scala, David Janssen, William Holden, Natalie Wood, and John Belushi.

Kennedy assassination and resignation 
Noguchi's autopsy of Robert Kennedy concluded that the fatal shot was fired into the back of Kennedy's head, behind the right ear, from an upward angle, and from a distance of no more than 0.5 to 3 inches (15–75 mm) away. Such a finding has given rise to conspiracy theories regarding the assassination, as no witnesses reported seeing the convicted assassin, Sirhan Sirhan, any closer to Kennedy than 1 meter away and in a position to fire such a shot. Noguchi himself points out in his memoir Coroner that he has never officially ruled that Sirhan fired the fatal shot.

Shortly after the Kennedy shooting, Noguchi came under scrutiny and resigned under pressure as Chief Medical Examiner after Deputy Los Angeles County Counsel Martin Weekes testified that he had seen a smiling Noguchi dancing in his office and that Noguchi had announced to associates "I am going to be famous. I hope he dies". A secretary in the coroner's office also testified she had heard Noguchi say he wanted to perform a vivisection on Lin Hollinger, the county's chief administrative officer with whom he had argued over budget matters.

Second term as CME and demotion 
Shortly after signing his letter of resignation, Noguchi attempted to withdraw it, a move that was rejected by the Board of Supervisors. Noguchi's wife subsequently charged that the county had forced him out as a practice of racial discrimination. The county rebutted the accusation by accusing Noguchi himself of being racist, providing testimony from an Asian-American employee in the CME office who said she had heard Noguchi saying he hated Jews and using a racial epithet to describe Black Americans. Other CME staff disputed that testimony and characterized Noguchi as "warm" and "articulate".

After a petition drive organized by Los Angeles' Japanese American community, Noguchi was restored to the office of CME.

In his second term, Noguchi was accused of speaking too freely to the media, particularly following the November 1981 deaths of William Holden and Natalie Wood, which, along with his moonlighting and alleged mismanagement – a series of articles in the Los Angeles Times alleged that Noguchi's attention to celebrity deaths was causing problems in the more mundane aspects of the CME office  –  led to his demotion from coroner to physician specialist in 1982. His autopsy of Wood's death as an accident has since been questioned. A former intern of Noguchi at the time of Wood's death stated that he saw bruises were substantial and fitting for someone who gets thrown out of a boat. He claimed that he made those observations to Noguchi, who reacted strangely as if he was involved in a cover-up. Noguchi came under public criticism for his handling of Wood's autopsy in 2016 and his ruling in that case was later changed by a successor.

Later career, honors, and professional bodies 
Noguchi was later appointed Chief of Pathology at the University of Southern California and then as Administrative Pathologist for Anatomic Pathology services at LAC+USC Medical Center.

Noguchi was appointed professor by both the University of Southern California and UCLA. He is a past president of the American National Association of Medical Examiners. In 1999 he was honored by the Emperor of Japan who awarded him the Order of the Sacred Treasure for his "outstanding contributions to Japan in the area of forensic science". He retired the same year.

, Noguchi is the president of World Association for Medical Law (WAML), which is a medical body founded in 1967 to encourage the study of health law, legal medicine, and bioethics.

Publications 
 Coroner, 1983.  A best selling memoir written with Joseph DiMona. (Published in the UK as Coroner to the Stars)
 Coroner at Large 1985. A book about historical coroners and famous deaths. (NYT review.)
 Unnatural Causes, 1988. A detective novel written with Arthur Lyons.
 Physical Evidence, 1990. A detective novel written with Arthur Lyons.

Film and other media 
 He has appeared in the documentary The Killing of America (1982).
 He appeared as himself in the film Faces of Death (1980).
 In 2000, Noguchi appeared in Michael Kriegsman's autopsy-related documentaries, "Autopsy: Through the Eyes of Death's Detectives"; and "Autopsy: Voices of Death", wherein Noguchi takes the viewer through a complete autopsy.
 He is said to have been the inspiration for the TV series Quincy, M.E. (1976–1983), which starred Jack Klugman.

References

External links 
 
 
 Subject's USC web page, last updated in 1999

1927 births
Living people
Writers from Los Angeles
People from Fukuoka Prefecture
Japanese emigrants to the United States
American coroners
Recipients of the Order of the Sacred Treasure
University of Southern California faculty
University of California, Los Angeles faculty
Persons involved with death and dying
Physicians from California
American physicians of Japanese descent